James Edward Pitts (born 1964) is a United States Navy rear admiral who has served as the Director of Warfare Integration since October 2, 2020. Previously, he served as the commander of Submarine Group 7.

Raised in Milton, Florida, Pitts graduated from the United States Naval Academy in 1986 with a Bachelor of Science degree in mechanical engineering. He later earned a Master of Arts degree in national security affairs from the Naval Postgraduate School in December 1992. His master's thesis was entitled Theater Ballistic Missile Defenses: An Emerging Role for the Navy?.

References

1964 births
Living people
Place of birth missing (living people)
People from Milton, Florida
United States Naval Academy alumni
Naval Postgraduate School alumni
United States submarine commanders
Recipients of the Meritorious Service Medal (United States)
Recipients of the Legion of Merit
United States Navy admirals
Recipients of the Defense Superior Service Medal